Vanuatu participated in the 2010 Summer Youth Olympics in Singapore.

The Vanuatu squad consisted of 22 athletes competing in 2 sports: basketball and football.

Basketball

Girls

RosterLavinia EdgellChristina IzonoEmily Lango (C)Poline Maliliu

Group A

17th–20th
This round will be contested by the 5th-place finishers of each group to compete for 17th to 20th positions.

Football

Boys

Group C

5th Place Match

References

External links
Competitors List: Vanuatu

Nations at the 2010 Summer Youth Olympics
2010 in Vanuatuan sport
Vanuatu at the Youth Olympics